Paul Michael Anthony Bowles (31 May 1957 – 14 March 2017) was an English footballer. A central defender, he scored 26 goals in 346 league appearances in a nine-year career in the Fourth Division of the Football League. He was a cousin of Stan Bowles.

Career

Crewe Alexandra
Bowles spent time as a youth player at Manchester United, before he started his career with Crewe Alexandra. He scored 20 goals in 178 Fourth Division appearances in four seasons at Gresty Road. He helped Harry Gregg's "Railwaymen" to finished 16th in 1975–76, 12th in 1976–77, and 15th in 1977–78, before Crewe fell to last place in the 1978–79 campaign under the stewardship of Warwick Rimmer.

Port Vale
He was signed by Alan Bloor at league rivals Port Vale for a £30,000 fee in October 1979. However two months later Bloor was replaced by John McGrath, who seemed not to rate Bowles. He was sent out on loan to Southampton in January 1980, although he never played first-team football for the "Saints", and instead made three appearances for the reserves. Back at Vale Park, he featured just eleven times in the 1979–80 campaign. Despite struggling with his weight, as one of the more experienced players in a youthful squad he was given the captaincy and featured 49 times in the 1980–81 season, scoring four goals. He played 53 of the "Valiants" 55 games in the 1981–82 season, but was given a free transfer to league rivals Stockport County in May 1982.

Stockport County
He played 70 league games for Eric Webster's "Hatters", helping the Edgeley Park outfit to post 16th and 12th places finishes in 1982–83 and 1983–84. However, he picked up a double fracture to his ankle playing against Liverpool at Anfield in the League Cup, and was unable to fully recover from the injury. He was released in summer 1985 and moved on to Northern Premier League side Barrow.

Style of play
Former Port Vale teammate Peter Farrell stated that Bowles was a good technical central defender.

Career statistics
Source:

References

1957 births
2017 deaths
People from Crumpsall
English footballers
Association football defenders
Crewe Alexandra F.C. players
Port Vale F.C. players
Southampton F.C. players
Stockport County F.C. players
Barrow A.F.C. players
English Football League players
Northern Premier League players